Alexander William Boyd (4 November 1883 – 28 July 1962) was an Australian rules footballer who played for the Geelong Football Club in the Victorian Football League (VFL).

Notes

External links 

1883 births
1962 deaths
Australian rules footballers from Victoria (Australia)
Geelong Football Club players
Barwon Football Club players